Yoshihito Nishioka defeated Denis Shapovalov in the final, 6–4, 7–6(7–5) to win the men's singles tennis title at the 2022 Korea Open. It was his first ATP Tour title since Shenzhen in 2018.

This was the first edition of an ATP Tour event in Seoul since 1996.

Seeds
The top four seeds received a bye into the second round.

Draw

Finals

Top half

Bottom half

Qualifying

Seeds

Qualifiers

Lucky losers

Qualifying draw

First qualifier

Second qualifier

Third qualifier

Fourth qualifier

References

External links 
Main draw
Qualifying draw

Korea Open - Singles
2022 Men's Singles